GNAS complex locus is a gene locus in humans. Its main product is the heterotrimeric G-protein alpha subunit Gs-α, a key component of G protein-coupled receptor-regulated adenylyl cyclase signal transduction pathways. GNAS stands for Guanine Nucleotide binding protein, Alpha Stimulating activity polypeptide.

Gene 
This gene locus has a highly complex imprinted expression pattern. It gives rise to maternally-, paternally- and biallelically-expressed transcripts that are derived from four alternative promoters with distinct 5' exons. Some transcripts contain a differentially methylated region (DMR) within their 5' exons; such DMRs are commonly found in imprinted genes and correlate with transcript expression. An antisense transcript also exists, and this antisense transcript and one of the sense transcripts are paternally expressed, produce non-coding RNAs and may regulate imprinting in this region. In addition, one of the transcripts contains a second frame-shifted open reading frame, which encodes a structurally unrelated protein named ALEX.

Products and functions 

The GNAS locus is imprinted and encodes 5 main transcripts:

 Gs-α (Gs-α long, P63092-1), biallelic
 A/B transcript (Gs-α short, P63092-2), biallelic: contains an alternate 5' terminal exon (A/B or Exon 1A) and uses a downstream start codon to have a shortened amino terminal region.
 STX16 deletion causes loss of methylation at the A/B exon, leading to PHP1B. 
 XLαs (Extra long alpha-s, Q5JWF2), paternal
 ALEX (Alternative gene product encoded by XL-exon, P84996), may inhibit XLαs
 NESP55 (Neuroendocrine secretory protein 55, O95467), maternal
 antisense GNAS transcript (Nespas: neuroendocrine secretory protein antisense)
 Binds to the PRC2 complex. Abolition of expression causes abnormal methylation and imprinting loss.

Alternative splicing of downstream exons is also observed, which results in different forms of the Gs-α, a key element of the classical signal transduction pathway linking receptor-ligand interactions with the activation of adenylyl cyclase and a variety of cellular responses. Multiple transcript variants have been found for this gene, but the full-length nature and/or biological validity of some variants have not been determined.

Three of the GNAS gene products, Gsα-long, Gsα-short, and XLαs, are different forms of Gsα, and differ mainly in the N-terminal region. Traditional G protein-coupled receptor signaling proceeds primarily through Gsα-long and Gsα-short, the most abundant, ubiquitously-expressed protein products of this gene. XLαs is the "extra large" isoform, and has a very long N-terminal region with some internal repeats not well-conserved across species. The XL exon also encodes in another reading frame the protein product ALEX, an inhibitory cofactor binding to the unique domain. The structure for GNAS is solved for the canonical P63092-1 isoform only, and little is known about what the special region of XLas or ALEX looks like.

NESP55 is a protein product completely unrelated to the GNAS protein. It undergoes extensive posttranslation processing, and is sometimes grouped as a granin. Nearly nothing is known about its structure; protein structure prediction predicts a mostly disordered protein with an N-terminal globular domain made up of alpha-helices.

Clinical significance 
Mutations in GNAS products are associated with: 
 Albright hereditary osteodystrophy
 pseudohypoparathyroidism type Ia and Ib
 pseudopseudohypoparathyroidism
McCune–Albright syndrome
 Myxoma

Mutations in this gene also result in progressive osseous heteroplasia, polyostotic fibrous dysplasia of bone, and some pituitary tumors. Mutations in the repeat region of the XL exon leads to a hyperactive form of XLas due to lowered interaction with ALEX. As XLas is expressed in platelets, the risk of bleeding is elevated.

Many alleles in mice have been constructed for analyzing disease associations. Mice with this gene half knocked-out and half-mutated (tm1Jop/Oedsml) display increased heart weight, increased startle reflex, and abnormalities in bone structure and mineralization; some other alternations can be lethal. Metabolic problems resembling pseudohypoparathyroidism are seen in heterozygous mutated (wt/Oedsml) mice. Knocking out the antisense transcript is known to, at minimum, cause methylation defects.

Interactions 
G protein-coupled receptor-activated Gsα binds to the enzyme adenylyl cyclase, increasing its rate of conversion of ATP to cyclic AMP.

Gsα has been shown to interact with RIC8A.

References

Further reading

External links 
 
 WikiGene index for literature mentioning this gene:
 GNAS: human, mouse, rat
 Nespas: human, mouse

Human proteins